Pietro Dallai (born 3 April 1947) is an Italian racing cyclist. He rode in the 1975 Tour de France.

References

External links
 

1947 births
Living people
Italian male cyclists
Place of birth missing (living people)
Cyclists from Tuscany
People from Borgo San Lorenzo
Sportspeople from the Metropolitan City of Florence